Irene Dwomoh (born 1986) is a beauty queen and model  who was named Miss Ghana 2006 and represented Ghana in Miss World 2007 in China, where she won the talent competition and got a fast track to the semi-finals. She studied Mathematics and Statistics at the University of Cape Coast.

References

External links

Miss World 2007 delegates
1986 births
Living people
Ghanaian beauty pageant winners